Aadukalam Murugadoss is an Indian actor who has appeared in Tamil language films. He made his breakthrough portraying Dhanush's friend in Vetrimaaran's critically acclaimed 2011 film. Aadukalam, thus adding the name of the film as a prefix to create a stage name.

Career
The actor was first seen in Ghilli (2004) as a team member of Vijay's Kabaddi team, featuring in several background shots throughout the film. He was also seen as one of the guard in  film Kanchivaram (2008). His breakthrough came in Vetrimaaran's Aadukalam, where he portrayed Dhanush's loyal friend and the success of the venture saw the film's name being added as a prefix to his stage name. His role in Mounaguru as a mentally challenged person was also appreciated, with a critic from The Hindu noting he does a "wonderful cameo". He was then seen in pivotal characters as the lead actor's aide in the 2012 action films Thadaiyara Thaakka and Mugamoodi.

In 2013, he appeared as Sasikumar's friend in Kutti Puli, as one of the four main leads in Thagaraaru and also played a comedy role in Kan Pesum Vaarthaigal. Murugadoss will star in a lead role for the first time with Kalvargal, to be directed by Balamithran.

Filmography

References

External links 
 

Year of birth missing (living people)
Indian male film actors
Male actors in Tamil cinema
Living people
Tamil comedians